Hellinsia biangulata is a moth of the family Pterophoridae. It is known from West Papua.

References

biangulata
Moths of New Guinea
Insects of Western New Guinea
Moths described in 2007